Knightdale High School of Collaborative Design (KHSCD) is a public high school part of the Wake County Public School System located in Knightdale, North Carolina.

History
The first Knightdale High School was operated from 1926 until 1955, when it was replaced by East Wake High School. From that time onward, the people of Knightdale had hoped to reopen a local high school to Knightdale. The current Knightdale High School opened on August 10, 2004. Currently, it is the only public high school in Knightdale, North Carolina.

During the 2015–2016 school year, Knightdale High School was renamed to Knightdale High School of Collaborative Design to promote positive growth in the school. The motto "Every Student College Ready" is held with the new change.

In June 2019 Keith Richardson became the principal.

Notable alumni

Ronnie Ash, track and field hurdler at the 2016 Summer Olympics
Burkheart Ellis, track and field sprinter at the 2016 Summer Olympics representing Barbados
Nate Harvey, NFL linebacker
Stan Okoye, professional basketball player and Olympian representing Nigeria

References

External links
 

Schools in Wake County, North Carolina
Public high schools in North Carolina